A power ring is an object featured in American comic books published by DC Comics. The power ring first appeared in All-American Comics #16 on July 14, 1940.

Green Lantern Corps
The first appearance of a power ring was in All-American Comics #16 on July 14, 1940, the flagship title of comic book publisher All-American Publications, which featured the first appearance of Alan Scott. Creator Martin Nodell has cited Richard Wagner's opera cycle The Ring of the Nibelung and the sight of a trainman's green railway lantern as inspirations for the combination of a magical ring and lantern.

Alan Scott's ring is powered by the Green Flame, a magically empowered flame contained within a metallic alien orb that was found and forged into a lantern and ring by a lampmaker named Chang. Later writers revised this to be a fragment of an object called the Starheart, the result of the Guardians of the Universe collecting and isolating most of the magic forces in the universe. This early version of the ring is shown as being powerless against wooden objects.

When the Green Lantern character was reinvented, beginning with the introduction of Hal Jordan, the magic ring concept was replaced with a scientifically-based one. The new version of the ring is created by the Guardians of the Universe, who also create the Green Lantern Corps.

Capabilities
No hard upper limit to the power ring's capabilities has yet been demonstrated; it is often referred to as the most powerful weapon in the DC universe.

The power ring's most distinctive effect is the generation of green, solid-light constructs, mainly weapons, the precise physical nature of which has never been specified. The size, complexity, and strength of these constructs is limited only by the ring-bearer's willpower; whatever the wearer imagines, the ring will create.

When active, a power ring will encase its user in a protective, life-supporting force field. This force field allows the user to fly, travel through inhospitable environments (outer space, underwater, etc.), and enter hyperspace to move vast distances quickly. The ring also generates its wearer's Green Lantern uniform, which appears over their normal attire and can be removed at will. The uniform varies from Lantern to Lantern, based on anatomy, personal preference, and the social norms of their race.

Power rings are able to give off electromagnetic radiation of various frequencies. This radiation can be focused by the wearer into a beam, similar in appearance and effect to a powerful laser. They also allow real-time communication between the different alien species of the Corps, translating all languages in the universe.

Limitations
Originally, Green Lantern power rings typically held a limited charge. In earlier appearances, they required recharging every 24 hours, but more recently they possess a fixed amount of regular charge: that is, the charge is good for 24 hours of 'typical' use, but extended or extensive use will drain the charge more quickly. Green Lantern rings typically reserve a small portion of their power for a passive force field that protects its wielder from mortal harm. In dire emergencies, that energy reserve can be tapped at the expense of that protection. Power rings are usually recharged by a Green Lantern's personal battery, which resembles an old-fashioned lantern made of dark green metal. The user typically points the ring towards the lantern and usually gives the Green Lantern oath (below) while recharging the ring. These batteries are directly linked to the Central Power Battery on Oa and do not themselves need recharging.

Various devices and abilities can drain the ring of its power against the will of its wearer, or absorb or store its energies for later use. Doctor Polaris constructed "power absorbers", both man-sized and in the form of a fortress, that drained Hal Jordan's ring's charge and transferred it to Polaris for his own use. A Manhunter robot drained most of the charge from Hal Jordan's ring using devices hidden under its face-plate and Hal later recharged his ring from the severed head of the destroyed Manhunter. Alpha Lanterns used technology similar to the Manhunters' to drain power rings. The device used by recurring Green Lantern foe, Black Hand, drains power ring energies from rings themselves, their constructs or objects that have been affected by them, for later reuse by the device's wielder. In the Marvel Comics/DC Comics crossover JLA/Avengers, Marvel superhero Photon, following an initial encounter with Kyle Rayner, successfully prepared herself to absorb the charge from his power ring when he attacked her with it, later reusing the energy to attack others.

Others may be able to track a ring's user by the energy trail it leaves behind. In the revised Post-Infinite Crisis origin of Green-Lantern nemesis, Black Hand, Black Hand's ring-draining device was originally constructed as a "cosmic divining rod" by Atrocitus to track Green Lanterns on Earth.

Originally, power rings were unable to affect objects colored yellow, though Lanterns have typically found ways around the limitation by indirect manipulation. The reason why the rings were unable to affect yellow objects has changed significantly from writer to writer. In early stories, it was because of a necessary design flaw. Gerard Jones revised this, in a story that revealed that the Guardians could change the weakness randomly and at will. After the destruction of the central battery, Ganthet revealed to Kyle Rayner that an "imperfection" in the central battery was responsible for the yellow weakness (which his ring did not share as there was no Central Battery at the time it was created). In Green Lantern: Rebirth, writer Geoff Johns revealed that the "yellow impurity" was the result of Parallax, a yellow-energy being made of pure fear, being imprisoned in the Central Power Battery. This change also allowed characters to overcome the yellow weakness by recognizing and facing the fear behind it.

By far, the most significant limitation of the power ring is the willpower of the wielder. The requirements needed to wield a power ring have changed sporadically during the history of Green Lantern titles, often creating continuity confusions. Allowing power rings to fall into the wrong hands has been a common plot device in many previous Green Lantern stories. However, only people with exceptional willpower can use a power ring, a restriction which makes use of the rings by average individuals incredibly difficult. For instance, when Green Arrow used a power ring to attack Sinestro, it pushed the hero's body to the point of exhaustion (and for all his effort he was only able to generate a single arrow, which did little to Sinestro other than annoy him). Mind control, hallucinogens, psychic attacks, "neural chaff" and other phenomena that disrupt thought processes will all indirectly impair a power ring's effectiveness. During Identity Crisis, the villain Deathstroke was able to use his own willpower and physical contact to prevent a wounded Kyle Rayner from operating his ring, at least momentarily, although this was taxing enough to leave Deathstroke completely open to attack from others. More abstractly, a weakening of resolve and will can impair the ring's effectiveness. For example, during the Millennium crossover, Hal Jordan fights a Manhunter who psychologically attacks him, to make him doubt that the people he is protecting value the principles he is fighting for. Jordan's resolve begins to weaken and his ring loses effectiveness, until one of his charges strikes the Manhunter, declaring that she does deeply value Jordan's principles as well. With this dramatic affirmation, Jordan's faith in his cause is restored and the ring instantly returns to full power. The ring, though, does have some psychic defenses: Guy Gardner's ring, apparently, is able to put up psi-shields around him and Blue Beetle in their battle against the Ultra-Humanite. There is also a limit to the amount of willpower the ring can take, as seen when John Stewart attempted to use his ring to re-build a destroyed planet, only to have his ring inform him, "Willpower exceeding power ring capabilities."

In the current incarnation of the Corps, the ring originally possessed programming to prevent the wearer from killing sentient beings. Hal Jordan was thought to have used power rings to kill a number of Corps members during Emerald Twilight, though he did tell Kilowog that he "left them enough power to survive." During the Sinestro Corps War event, they were revealed to be alive, held prisoner by the Cyborg Superman on the planet Biot. These Lanterns are referred to as the "Lost Lanterns". Any attempt to kill using a green power ring was automatically diverted and, in some cases, resulted in the ring locking out the user. However, this restriction was rescinded by the Guardians to combat the Sinestro Corps, then for the general execution of their duties. However, the rings are, apparently, still unable to be used against a Guardian, although Hal Jordan was apparently able to overpower this restriction when he killed the renegade Guardian, Krona, in the final battle.

It has been claimed in-universe that only a pure form of willpower can use the ring effectively. When Green Arrow tried to use Hal Jordan's power ring against Sinestro, it caused him great pain and difficulty because (according to Sinestro) Green Arrow's will was "cynical". It has also been shown that the user's stamina is drained with every construct. When Green Arrow fires a small arrow-like construct from the ring, he describes the experience as feeling like losing a week's worth of sleep. When he questions Kyle Rayner about this, Kyle affirms that the feeling is normal.

It was believed for a long time that only the Guardians could create new rings, but Hal Jordan was able to prove this wrong when he reforged his ring after the disappearance of the rest of the Corps while using Krona's prototype gauntlet.

Oaths

All power rings need periodic recharging. When doing so, many Green Lanterns recite an oath while the ring charges. The oath is not required to charge the ring, but is recited to reaffirm the person's commitment to the Green Lantern Corps. While many Green Lanterns create their own oath, the majority use the Corps' official oath as a sign of respect. This practice has been abandoned with the reinstating of the Green Lantern Corps. As additional Corps have been introduced into DC continuity, with their own power rings, corresponding oaths unique to each Corps have been formulated as well.

Kyle Rayner's ring
After the destruction of Coast City during the "Reign of the Supermen!" story arc, Green Lantern Hal Jordan goes mad and betrays the Corps. He defeats most of the Corps on his way to Oa, enters the Central Power Battery and absorbs most of its energies, along with the yellow impurity, to become the villain Parallax. With the Central Power Battery destroyed, all the remaining power rings stop working. In desperation, Ganthet, the only surviving Guardian, uses what little power remains to create a new power ring and gives it to Kyle Rayner.

Kyle's ring is unique throughout the history of the Green Lantern characters, and was, for a time, the only working power ring in the DC Universe. His ring is not dependent on the Central Power Battery and is free from the yellow impurity. However, it does not prevent mortal damage automatically. The ring no longer needs to be charged every 24 hours; instead, its use is based on how much power it absorbs when recharging and how much is expended when it is in use. For example, after the destruction of Oa, Kyle's ring has more power than ever before and does not need to be recharged for an extended period of time. Unlike Hal Jordan's ring, it is unable to make copies of itself. After Kyle became settled into his role as the new Green Lantern, a Hal Jordan from the past visits Kyle's time after his own death as Parallax. He gives a copy of his ring to Kyle, which has the ability to replicate itself. Kyle attempts to use Hal's ring to restart the Green Lantern Corps, with limited results.

The apparently random induction in the Corps, more than once contested by Ganthet as simple chance during most of the Green Lantern (vol. 3) run, is later retconned into the very first induction of a new breed of Lanterns. Since the Corps has become aware of the emotional spectrum, and the crippling effects the yellow light of Fear radiated by Parallax has over the green light of Will radiated by Ion, the Lantern rookies are not chosen anymore by merely people unable to feel fear, but from people able to feel, and overcome their fear. Since Kyle had always been able to do so, wrestling against his fears for his entire life, his ring gained immunity against the yellow impurity and his particularly fortified will was instrumental in bringing about the rebirth of the Corps and setting an example to follow for the newer recruits.

Before giving up the power of the Central Battery, Kyle further modified his ring. He gave the ring a permanent back-up charge (so his ring could never be totally powerless). He also designed a recall feature that if his ring were ever removed from his hand, it could be summoned by him wherever he was.

In the Marvel/DC crossover JLA/Avengers, after Photon drained and absorbed the energy from Kyle's power ring, Kyle was able to will his ring to recharge itself from the energies of a Cosmic Cube, coating Kyle in a chrome-blue glow and Kirby krackle. He recited Hal Jordan's Green Lantern oath during the task and implied he believed the oath would help his ring "hold together" under the strain of the Cube's "serious mojo".

Kyle has recently shown an ability to use his ring to communicate with members of the other six Corps, despite them operating on a different 'wavelength' as his ring that would normally prevent such communication, convincing the ring to draw on the emotions of hope and fear that he himself was feeling and use that to communicate with them. After the start of the New Guardians storyline, Kyle has been able to tap any color of the emotional spectrum that he is feeling at the time, eventually progressing to the point where he can channel the power of all seven Corps, 'evolving' into a White Lantern. The Guardians have stated that, unlike a normal Green Lantern's ring, his ring is too contaminated with different emotional energies for them to track his location. His White Lantern ring was essentially destroyed after he tried to use it to restore the Blue Lantern Corps, hinted to be the result of some external force, but after it broke into the seven different rings of the seven Corps, Kyle accepted a return to his original Green Lantern ring, while the other six rings flew off to find new wearers.

Phantom Ring
In the DC Rebirth era, Simon Baz and Jessica Cruz found themselves facing Frank Laminski, a man obsessed with becoming a Green Lantern himself, who acquired the Phantom Ring, an early prototype of the Green Lantern rings created by the Guardian of the Universe Rami, which could, theoretically, be worn by anyone as opposed to later rings choosing their wearers. The Phantom Ring is capable of channeling the entirety of the emotional spectrum, but unlike Kyle's ring after he 'evolved' into a White Lantern, which channeled the entire spectrum at will, the Phantom Ring shifts through the spectrum one color at a time depending on which emotion that the wearer is feeling most strongly at any moment (even if it's just for a second), creating the risk of them becoming compromised by the ring's power. As well as this, the ring does not have an external battery, but relies on the wearer's own life-energy, creating the risk that they would destroy themselves if they pushed themselves too far. Laminski almost kills Simon and Jessica when he confronts them after trying to act as a hero, his greed and anger causing him to tap into both the Red and Orange rings, but when he is forced to face the damage that he has done, he reverts to an Indigo ring long enough to remove the Phantom Ring himself.

Other power rings
While Green Lantern villain Sinestro had his own version of the power ring since 1961, a yellow one that exploited the one color Green Lanterns were ineffective against, in the late 2000s writer Geoff Johns and artist Ethan Van Sciver worked the concept of a spectrum of power rings, revolving around the colors of the rainbow as well as a corresponding emotion from which they derive their abilities. The storylines "Sinestro Corps War" and "Blackest Night" introduce the rest of the spectrum, along with its emotions, corps and rings: red (rage), orange (avarice/greed), yellow (fear), green (willpower), blue (hope), indigo (compassion), violet (love), black (death), and white (life).

Red

Atrocitus, a member of the Empire of Tears on the prison planet Ysmault, forged the first Red Power Battery from the innards of Qull, the being who tells Abin Sur the prophecy of "the Blackest Night". Red power rings are powered by rage, feed on the rage of their users and anyone nearby, and are charged by the blood of those the user kills. Unlike Green Lantern rings, which provide a helpful commentary to their user, red rings are depicted as constantly emitting violent commands ("Kill," "Rage," "Pain," "Hatred," etc.), driving their wearers insane with rage and reducing them to little more than snarling beasts. The rings, however, seek out beings with great rage.

A user's red ring functionally stops the user's heart, tainting their blood with red energy, and forces it out of their body through their mouth as a highly corrosive substance. The red ring's energy is also capable of corrupting the energies of other power rings, keeping them from functioning properly. The aura of a red ring is savage and rough in comparison to a green ring, but can be used similarly with sufficient focus, as Atrocitus demonstrates by creating a giant construct of Mera. Originally, a Blue Lantern's energy was the only known power source capable of neutralizing the Red Lanterns' influences, and are also the only means of removing a red power ring from its user without killing them. Mogo managed to purify Guy Gardner during the Blackest Night but as Guy has not been cured by a Blue Lantern, traces of the Red Rage remain. Also, a Star Sapphire, working with a Red Lantern's true love, is capable of restoring a Red Lantern.

Orange

An orange ring is powered by avarice (greed) and unlike the other Corps, only one living individual can wield the power of the orange light since orange ring-bearers are so consumed with greed that they cannot bear the thought of sharing power with others. Larfleeze is the user of the orange light, however, Lex Luthor briefly shared that power with him during the "Blackest Night" storyline, and both Hal Jordan and Kyle Rayner have briefly become Orange Lanterns, the former by taking the Battery from him and the later by mastering Avarice by getting past Larfleeze in a fight and recharging his ring from Larfleeze's battery, altering his appearance to match each, and elevating himself to White Lantern status once he mastered all the lights of the Emotional Spectrum.

The orange ring allows Larfleeze the same abilities as other Corps: flight, aura projection and orange light constructs. As a side effect of wielding the orange light, Larfleeze is burdened with an insatiable hunger that is never quelled regardless of how much food he eats. The power of the orange light allows Larfleeze to steal the identities of those he kills, transforming them into an "Orange Lantern" construct. These Orange Lanterns are able to steal the identities of others for Larfleeze in the same way. The orange light also has the power to absorb the energy of other power rings. However, it cannot absorb constructs produced by violet or blue power rings. By being in constant contact with his main power battery, Larfleeze has become one with his power source. This allows him to maintain a power level high enough to support an entire Corps of orange light constructs even when separated from it. Larfleeze and his constructs are resistant to magic and the abilities of green power rings, but do not retain the same protection against blue or violet rings. The blue light of hope can also nullify his insatiable hunger when he is near a bearer of it.

Yellow

The first yellow ring is acquired by Thaal Sinestro following his banishment to the antimatter universe of Qward, and could only be recharged by fighting a Green Lantern. After Sinestro was imprisoned in the power battery, his ring was left in the Crypts of the Green Lanterns on Oa, where it was eventually taken by Guy Gardner, who used it until it was destroyed by Parallax. The Qwardian Weaponers later forged two more rings to be used against the Green Lantern Corps, wielded by Fatality – which self-destructed as she tried to remove the ring, exploding her left arm – and Nero.<ref>Green Lantern''' (vol. 3) #132 (January 2001)</ref>

Upon his return to life in the Green Lantern: Rebirth storyline, Sinestro was seen wearing a new yellow power ring. Before he could be defeated Sinestro retreated to the anti-matter universe where he spent a year creating his Sinestro Corps. Yellow Power rings are now fueled by fear instead of willpower, but function the same as their green counterparts. Members of the Sinestro Corps are chosen for their ability to instill great fear in others. To become a member of the Sinestro Corps, one must free themselves from a small prison. With their yellow power ring completely drained of its energy, they must provide it with the spark it needs to accomplish this feat by facing their own greatest fear. Originally Yellow rings could be charged by Manhunter androids that have yellow power batteries built into themselves, which in turn are connected to the Central Yellow Power Battery on Qward. There are also portable batteries similar to those used by Green Lanterns. Aside from the recharging limitations common among the various Corps, their only known weakness is that their power can be drained by a Blue power ring or disrupted by a Red Power Ring.

According to Ethan Van Sciver, the ring's symbol is based on ancient carvings made by beings who had looked into the gullet of Parallax and survived.

Blue

As the Sinestro Corps War ends, former Guardian of the Universe Ganthet creates the first blue power ring. The home planet of the Blue Lanterns and the Central Blue Power Battery is the planet Odym, an idyllic planet orbiting the star Polaris. Blue power rings are fueled by hope; they give their users the most power, but they must be near an active Green power ring to tap into their full potential. Otherwise, the blue rings are only capable of the abilities of ordinary Green Lantern rings. This is because hope requires willpower to enact it.

While within the proximity of a Green Lantern's ring, a blue ring can heal wounds, neutralize the corrupting effects of a red power ring, block the energy-stealing properties of orange rings, drain power from yellow power rings, and recharge a green power ring to twice its maximum power level. This effect can also negatively impact a green ring, as close proximity to the blue central power battery will overcharge a green ring, causing it to implode (taking the user's hand with it). If a Blue Lantern wishes it, it can also dampen the hunger caused by the orange light. A noteworthy ability of blue rings is the power to scan a target's psyche and create illusions based on their hopes. A blue power ring is capable of feeding off the hope of other beings, eschewing constant recharging while still performing impressive feats, including reversing a dying sun's age. Blue rings can also grant precognitive visions to their wielders.

Indigo

The Indigo Tribe, wielders of the indigo light of compassion, make their first extended appearance in Blackest Night: Tales of the Corps #1 (July 2009). Unlike other Corps, the Indigo Tribe carry carved, lantern-like staves with them. In Blackest Night #5, it is established that Indigo Tribe members use their staffs instead of power batteries to charge their rings. In addition to being able to store indigo light energy, they are also capable of replicating the power of other emotional lights, providing indigo power rings access to the abilities of other Corps. To use the power of another Corps, Indigo Tribesmen must be in the vicinity of one of that Corps' members. Without that closeness, their access to the abilities of that emotional light fades. While channeling another Emotional energy, an Indigo Tribesman can be used as a Battery to charge the ring of that Corp. However, this is "simulated energy" and thus does not provide the full range of abilities. For example, a Green Lantern charged thusly can create constructs and a uniform, but cannot fly.

Like all power rings, indigo rings are capable of the default Corps abilities of flight and protective aura generation. Indigo power rings give their users the ability to perceive compassion in others and to force compassion onto those who feel none.Blackest Night #3 (September 2009) Paradoxically, indigo light has the ability to heal individuals with great empathy and to expose people to pain they have inflicted on other people. Indigo Power Rings can teleport their users and others over intergalactic distances. This ability utilizes a great deal of power from an indigo power ring, and Indigo Tribe members try to use it sparingly.

Violet

At the conclusion of the Mystery of the Star Sapphire story-arc, the Zamarons realize that the power of the Star Sapphire gem is too great for them to control so they forge a Violet Power Battery and power ring out of the Star Sapphire gem, using the bodies that sparked the Star Sapphire as a mediator. This allows them to distribute its powers throughout an entire Corps of Star Sapphires.

Violet power rings are fueled by the emotion of love. They allow their wearer to fly, generate a protective aura (which creates distinct feathered and organic shapes), and create violet light constructs. Violet rings have several unique abilities. They can create crystals which can be used to imprison members of other Lantern Corps on the Zamaron planet. Over time, the rings of the prisoners trapped in stasis within the crystals are infused with violet energy. After spending enough time inside, the prisoner will emerge as a Star Sapphire. The rings can also detect when a love is in jeopardy, locate it, and then create a connection to the embattled heart that can be used as a tether. Sapphires are also shown as being able to show others their greatest love. Unlike constructs created by Green Lanterns, Orange Lanterns cannot absorb those made by Star Sapphires. Star Sapphires are able to teleport to escape attackers, while their constructs release a disorienting dust when destroyed. These two abilities can be combined effectively to avoid being pursued. Violet power rings can restore the recently deceased to life by drawing power from the heart of one that loves them.

Although Violet Power Rings do not have a particular weakness to other colors, they are more susceptible to controlling their user by their own power. Love is one of the two emotions on the far ends of the emotional spectrum, and has a much stronger influence over its user. Unlike the Star Sapphire gem, which could force itself on a user, violet power rings must be accepted by the wearer."

Black

Black power rings are fueled by death, instead of light from the emotional spectrum. In the concluding issues of the Sinestro Corps War, Superboy-Prime hurls the Anti-Monitor into space. His dying essence crashes onto the dead planet of Ryut and is encased in the Black Central Power Battery. Black Hand becomes the first Black Lantern after killing his family and committing suicide; Scar comes to him and regurgitates the first black power ring. As noted by Ray Palmer, the structure of black rings is similar to dark matter. The symbol on black power rings (a triangle pointing down, with five lines radiating up) is the same symbol used by Green Lantern villain Black Hand and his family.

Black power rings are wielded by the deceased. In addition to the abilities granted to them by the rings, Black Lanterns retain any superpowers they may have had in life. If the ring bearer's body is severely damaged or destroyed, the black ring will partially reconstruct the body, restoring it to a working state. However, this is seen less as a limitation of the ring and more as emotional warfare, as the haunting, zombie-like appearance of Black Lanterns leaves those who were close to them in life emotionally vulnerable. Black Lanterns' rings are able to read the emotions of the living as colored auras that correlate to the emotional spectrum. Multiple emotions read as a multicolored aura, while unreadable emotions come out as white or black. A state of suspended animation is also enough to fool a black ring's senses. Emotionless hearts, such as the Scarecrow's, render their bearers equally invisible to Black Lanterns. When facing beings with warped mental states or otherwise addled minds, the correlation between the emotion detected and the color seen is inverted.

A combination of two different lights of the emotional spectrum can neutralize black rings, rendering them vulnerable. Once a black ring is destroyed, the corpse it animates becomes inert. Black Lanterns are vulnerable to white light, described in Blackest Night #3 as the "white light of creation." Other methods exist for destroying Black Rings. Kimiyo Hoshi and Halo can destroy black power rings using their light-based powers.Outsiders (vol. 4) #25 (December 2009) Conner Kent used the Medusa Mask to force two Black Lanterns to experience the fullness of the Emotional Spectrum, irritating their black rings enough that they removed themselves and fled. Superboy-Prime took control of a black power ring and was forced to experience all of the emotional spectrum except for hope, forcing the ring to shift abilities and uniforms as his emotions went out of control. The ring ultimately detonated. The "touch" of a Black Lantern, used to remove their victims' hearts and drain them of emotional energy, can sever the connection between other Black Lanterns and their black ring. Time travel can deactivate a searching black ring.

Some characters have been shown as able to resist black rings for various reasons, including being immortal, being at complete peace after death, or being a Red Lantern.

White

The first white power ring is depicted during the Blackest Night event. The exact capabilities and limitations of white power rings are still unknown, but they have been shown as capable of providing their bearers with the default Corps abilities of flight, protective aura generation, and light construct creation. Their most notable and unique ability to date is the power to resurrect the dead. The first instances of this ability were shown not by the intention of any individual, but by the ring itself. They are also shown "overriding" power rings of other colors, turning them white for a period of time.

Ultraviolet
Introduced as a brand new piece of the Emotional Spectrum following the fall of the Source Wall, the Ultraviolet Corps tap into the Invisible Emotional Spectrum and unlike most Lantern Corps which use physical rings, brand members with Power Ring tattoos. Its members are capable of using Ultraviolet energy which takes the form of purple/violet light, supplied by Umbrax (a living Phantom Galaxy) and the ambient negative emotional energy from the user and their surroundings to provide the default Corps abilities of flight, protective aura generation, and light construct creation. Their most notable and unique ability to date is the power to infect others with the most hateful, self-destructive, and primeval elements held deep within their hearts and mind. Ultraviolet Power Rings feed off the bloodlust and self-hatred of anyone they come in contact with, assimilating them into the Ultraviolet Lantern cause. Powerful wielders of the ring can infuse their targets with the UV power and bind them to their rings on a cellular level.

Gold
In the 2020–2021 Legion of Super-Heroes comic series, Kala Lour, a.k.a. Gold Lantern, appears as a member of the Legion of Super-Heroes in the 31st century. Towards the end of the series, Gold Lantern's employers are revealed to be the Elders of Oa, the 31st-century versions of the Guardians of the Universe.

Alternate versions
In the alternate universe of Superman & Batman: Generations, it was stated that the rings' weakness is actually only based on what the users believe the rings are vulnerable to; Alan Scott—whose ring here is a lost Green Lantern ring rather than the Starheart—believed that his ring was vulnerable to wood because he was caught off-guard by someone wielding a wooden block the first time that he used the ring. After Scott's retirement, the ring was passed to Kyle Rayner, who uses it with the belief that it is vulnerable to yellow, until Hal Jordan—here the President of the United States, previously approached to become the new Green Lantern before he decided to go into politics—dons the ring to fight off Sinestro, correctly deducing that it has no true vulnerabilities, with the Guardians explaining the truth to the heroes.

In the Elseworlds storyline JLA: Another Nail, a power ring essentially merges with a Mother Box when Big Barda is chosen as a Green Lantern when the war between New Genesis and Apokolips becomes so intense that even the Green Lantern Corps have to step in. Through its link to the Mother Box, the ring thus also 'hosts' the consciousness of Mister Miracle, who escaped being tortured to death by transferring his conscious mind into Barda's Mother Box before she was chosen by the ring.

In the crossover miniseries Star Trek/Green Lantern: The Spectrum War, various members of the seven Corps are transferred into the new Star Trek timeline when Nekron's latest attack causes Ganthet to initiate the 'Last Light' protocol, transferring the last power rings and living wielders to another universe. After Hal Jordan, Carol Ferris and Saint Walker make contact with the USS Enterprise, along with Doctor Leonard McCoy, Nyota Uhura and Pavel Chekov being chosen by reserve rings of the Indigo Tribe, Star Sapphires and Blue Lantern Corps respectively, Montgomery Scott's analysis of the rings allows him to create his own version. He gives this ring to Hikaru Sulu. Although he freely admits that the rings are so complex he feels like a caveman trying to understand a warp core, Scotty's rings can generate personal force-fields and fire energy blasts at the user's will, Scotty comparing it to a phaser worn on the finger. At the conclusion of the series, Kirk's log notes that Scotty has received permission to put the rings into mass production. In the sequel Star Trek/Green Lantern: Strange Worlds, the Enterprise discovers the version of Oa that exists in their universe, with Sinestro's attack forcing the Guardians to release their prototype Green Lantern ring, which chooses James T. Kirk as a wielder as he confronts Sinestro and Khan simultaneously.

The Universal Ring is found in the crossover with Planet of the Apes, this ring was created by the Guardians of the Universe by using sorcery and science in conjunction. The user of this ring can tap directly into the energies of the emotional spectrum and harness any color of it, despite whatever emotion is being felt and regardless of intentions. This ring can also drain the other rings of the energies that power them, rendering them useless. However, the Guardians of the Universe would eventually discover that users of the ring will eventually succumb to its corrupted power and be forced to create more rings. As they were unable to destroy it, they sent it away to a version of Earth permanently locked in a time loop, therefore isolating it from the rest of Hypertime, with them hoping that it could never be found.

In Batman: The Dawnbreaker—part of a series of one-shots looking at darker alternate versions of Batman—when Bruce Wayne was chosen as the Green Lantern immediately after the deaths of his parents, his rage and emotional trauma were so great that he was able to overcome the ring's limitations against using lethal force by nothing more than strength of will. This dark attitude results in him drawing on an unspecified 'void' through his ring, which allows him to overwhelm even a large number of other Green Lanterns and Guardians when they come to confront him over his violation of the rules of Oa.

In Green Lantern: Earth One'', the power rings are seen merely as powerful weapons. They do not choose their users, can be used by anyone and do not require the wielder to be capable of great willpower or overcoming fear and do not appear to possess any degree of artificial intelligence or capacity for independent action. No oath is required to charge them. Following the apparent destruction of the Central Power Battery by the Manhunters, the power of the rings was limited, but their full power was unlocked following the recovery of the battery from Oa.

See also
Legion Flight Ring
Infinity Gems
The Infinity Gauntlet
Magic ring
Power Prism
Quantum bands

Notes

References

DC Comics weapons
Fictional elements introduced in 1940
Fictional rings (jewellery)
Green Lantern